A House Divided is an American web television soap opera created by Dan Garcia and starring Demetria McKinney, Paula Jai Parker, Brad James and Lawrence Hilton-Jacobs. The series follows the members of a wealthy Sanders family in the Los Angeles after the loss of the family's matriarch while uncovering and facing a variety of secrets and scandals.

The first season premiered on the streaming service Urban Movie Channel on July 18, 2019. On October 25, 2019, the series was renewed for the second season, while LisaRaye McCoy and Parker McKenna Posey have joined the cast. The first season received three Indie Series Awards nominations. On May 10, 2021, the series was renewed for a fourth season.

Plot

A House Divided follows the direct descendant of Letty Sanders, an enslaved woman who after arriving in Los Angeles, California in 1821 and became the wealthiest Black woman in the newly formed city. Centering on the present-day members of the highly esteemed Sanders family, Cameron Sanders (Lawrence Hilton-Jacobs) has raised his three children: Stephanie (Paula Jai Parker), Cameron, Jr. (Brad James), and Torrance (Steph Santana), in opulent wealth. After the sudden passing of his wife amidst a brewing government investigation into the business dealings of the family-owned bank, a new woman, Carissa Walker (Demetria McKinney) emerges from the shadows determined to be the next Mrs. Cameran Sanders. As secrets are uncovered and scandals emerge, the Sanders family will be forced to band together for the sake of their survival or risk the ultimate demise of their long-standing legacy.

Cast and characters
 Demetria McKinney as Carissa Walker
 Lawrence Hilton-Jacobs as Cameron Sanders, Sr. 
 Paula Jai Parker as Stephanie Sanders
 Brad James as Cameron Sanders, Jr.
 Orlando Eric Street as Maynard

Episodes

Season 1 (2019)

Season 2 (2020)

Season 3 (2020–21)

Season 4 (2022)

Season 5 (2023)

References

External links
 

English-language television shows
2019 American television series debuts
Television series about families
American television soap operas
Television shows set in Los Angeles
Urban Movie Channel original programming